The volcano shrew (Sylvisorex vulcanorum) is a species of mammal in the family Soricidae found in the high-altitude rainforest of Burundi, eastern Democratic Republic of the Congo, Rwanda, and Uganda. Its natural habitats are subtropical or tropical moist montane forests and swamps.  Its type locality is at Karisoke in Rwanda.

References

Sylvisorex
Taxonomy articles created by Polbot
Mammals described in 1985